

The Cox-Klemin XA-1 was a 1920s American air ambulance biplane designed and built by the Cox-Klemin Aircraft Corporation for the United States Army Air Service, only two prototypes were built.

Design and development
The XA-1 was designed as an ambulance aircraft to replace modified de Havilland DH.4 aircraft with the United States Army Air Service. The XA-1 was a biplane powered by a  Liberty 12A engine with a fixed conventional landing gear, it had a crew of two and room for two stretchers. Two prototype aircraft designated XA-1 (A-1 was the first allocation in the army air services ambulance designation system) were flown but no further aircraft were built.

The aircraft gained fame for flying injured individuals to hospitals in the aftermath of the 1927 tornado that destroyed Rocksprings, Texas. It was retired in 1932.

Specifications (XA-1)

References
Notes

Bibliography

External links

A-001
1920s United States military utility aircraft
Single-engined tractor aircraft
Biplanes
Aircraft first flown in 1923